Alessandra Santos de Oliveira (born 2 December 1973 in São Paulo) is a Brazilian former basketball player who spent 17 years in the national team, winning the 1994 FIBA World Championship for Women and two Olympic medals, silver in Atlanta 1996, and bronze in Sydney 2000, along with a fourth place in the 2004 Summer Olympics and the 1998 and 2006 World Championships. She has also competed in 10 different countries, including three WNBA teams - Washington Mystics (1998–99), Indiana Fever (2000) and Seattle Storm (2001).

References

External links
 

1973 births
Living people
Basketball players from São Paulo
Brazilian women's basketball players
Brazilian expatriate basketball people in the United States
Brazilian expatriate sportspeople in France
Brazilian expatriate sportspeople in Hungary
Brazilian expatriate sportspeople in Italy
Brazilian expatriate sportspeople in Romania
Brazilian expatriate sportspeople in Russia
Brazilian expatriate sportspeople in Spain
Brazilian expatriate sportspeople in Slovakia
Brazilian expatriate sportspeople in South Korea
Brazilian expatriate sportspeople in Turkey
Olympic basketball players of Brazil
Basketball players at the 1996 Summer Olympics
Basketball players at the 2000 Summer Olympics
Basketball players at the 2004 Summer Olympics
Olympic silver medalists for Brazil
Olympic bronze medalists for Brazil
Olympic medalists in basketball
Indiana Fever players
Seattle Storm players
Washington Mystics players
Basketball players at the 2003 Pan American Games
Pan American Games bronze medalists for Brazil
Medalists at the 2000 Summer Olympics
Medalists at the 1996 Summer Olympics
Pan American Games medalists in basketball
Medalists at the 2003 Pan American Games